Look Away by Sky Documentaries is a documentary about sexual abuse of young girls in the rock music industry.

The film's title comes from a track of the same name on Iggy Pop's 1996 album Naughty Little Doggie, which is a "tribute" to one of the most famous "baby groupies" on Sunset Strip in the 70s, Sable Starr. The track of the same name mentions in its lyrics that Pop slept with Starr when she was 13, with none of the reviews of the album addressing the lyrics.

Look Away is built around extensive interviews with Kari Krome, the Runaways' bass guitarist Jackie Fuchs, and Julia Holcomb. The documentary describes several rapes and other sexual abuse, including a detailed account of the alleged rape of Jackie Fuchs by her band's then-manager Kim Fowley. It also tells the story of the relationship between Julia Holcomb and Aerosmith's Steven Tyler, and offers interviews of other people with experiences of sexual abuse in the United States rock scene in the 70s and 80s.

According to an interview of director Sophie Cunningham by the Sky News, the point of the film "is not necessarily about seeking justice in the legal sense, but having a voice – and trying to instigate change. Although we are focusing on a certain era in this film, the music industry is still functioning in a very, very similar way."

Reception 
Uncut rated the film 3.5 stars out of 5, while The Telegraph, The Guardian and the Financial Times rated it 4 stars out of 5.

The film was nominated for Broadcast Digital Award for Best Documentary Programme, and the director Sophie Cunningham was nominated in the Best Emerging Talent category in BAFTA Craft Awards 2022 for the film.

After the film was nominated by BAFTA, it was discussed on Instagram by Courtney Love, where she supported some of the claims made, commenting that Steven Tyler also adopted another 13-year old girl in a similar fashion.

References

External links 

Look Away at IMDb

2021 films
2021 documentary films
British documentary films
Films about sexual abuse